Federal Route 124, or Jalan Jerangau-Jabor (Penghantar 2), is a federal road in Terengganu, Malaysia.

Features
At most sections, the Federal Route 124 was built under the JKR R5 road standard, allowing maximum speed limit of up to 90 km/h.

List of junctions and towns

References

Malaysian Federal Roads